The 2015–16 Siena Saints women's basketball team represents Siena College  during the 2015–16 NCAA Division I women's basketball season. The Saints, led by fourth year head coach, Ali Jaques. They play their home games in play their home games at the Alumni Recreation Center with two games at Times Union Center, and were members of the Metro Atlantic Athletic Conference. They finished the season 14–18, 10–10 in MAAC play to finish in tenth place. They advanced to the quarterfinals of the MAAC women's tournament where they lost to Iona.

See also
 2015–16 Siena Saints men's basketball team

References

Siena Saints women's basketball
Siena